Jasdir is a name

List of people with the given name 

 Jasvir Deol (born 1968/1969), Canadian politician
 Jasvir Rakkar (born 1991), Canadian baseball player
 Jasvir Singh (disambiguation), multiple people

List of people with the surname

See also 

 Jasbir (disambiguation)

Surnames of Indian origin
Masculine given names
Punjabi-language surnames